The spouse of the prime minister of Cambodia refers to the wife or husband of the head of government of the Kingdom of Cambodia, the Prime Minister. Since 1993, 3 women have been the spouse of the Prime Minister of Cambodia. The title "First Lady" is also commonly used.

The spouse of the current prime minister is Dr. Bun Rany.

Role
The position is not an elected position, thus the spouse of the prime minister does not hold any official duties. The spouse of the prime minister of Cambodia frequently participates in humanitarian and charitable work as well as representing the prime minister. The incumbent Bun Rany holds the position of President of the Cambodian Red Cross.

Spouses (since 1993)

See also
 Cambodian Red Cross
 List of prime ministers of Cambodia

References

Cambodia
Cambodian women in politics